The Blackstone Block Historic District encompasses what was once a waterfront business area in Boston, Massachusetts. Due to the infill of land it is now slightly inland from the waterfront. The district is bounded by Union, Hanover, Blackstone, and North Streets, not far from Quincy Market and Faneuil Hall.  It includes the Union Oyster House, a National Historic Landmark building erected in the 1710s, and a collection of commercial buildings dating from the late 18th and 19th centuries. The district was added to the National Register of Historic Places in 1973. It also includes the c. 1770s Ebenezer Hancock House (10 Marshall Street), a Federal-style wood-frame house that is the only building left in the city which was known to be owned by John Hancock. The building was designated a Boston Landmark by the Boston Landmarks Commission in 1978 for its notable exterior and interiors. In 1983, the surrounding ca. 1676 Blackstone Block Street Network was also designated by the Boston Landmarks Commission.

See also
National Register of Historic Places listings in northern Boston, Massachusetts

External links
Ebenezer Hancock House Study Report
Blackstone Block Street Network Study Report

References

Historic districts in Suffolk County, Massachusetts
Government Center, Boston
National Register of Historic Places in Boston
Historic districts on the National Register of Historic Places in Massachusetts